Cedar Bluff is a rural unincorporated community in central Caldwell County, Kentucky, United States.

References

Unincorporated communities in Caldwell County, Kentucky
Unincorporated communities in Kentucky